Sir Winfried Franz Wilhelm "Win" Bischoff (born 10 May 1941) is an Anglo-German banker and former chairman of Lloyds Banking Group. He previously served as chairman and interim CEO of Citigroup in 2007. He was succeeded as CEO by Vikram Pandit on 11 December 2007. Bischoff stepped down as chairman on 23 February 2009 and was replaced by Richard Parsons. He has dual British and German citizenship.
Bischoff was knighted in 2000.

Early life and education
He was born in Aachen, Germany and had an early education in Cologne and
Düsseldorf. In 1955, he moved to Johannesburg where he received a Bachelor of Commerce degree at the University of the Witwatersrand in 1961.

Career
Bischoff worked in the International Department of Chase Manhattan Bank from 1962 to 1963. He joined J. Henry Schroder & Co. Limited in London in 1966 in its Company Finance Division. In 1971, he became Managing Director of Schroders Asia Limited in Hong Kong. He became Group Chief Executive of Schroders plc in December 1984, when Schroders was worth £30 million. He became chairman in May 1995. In 2000, the investment banking division of the company was acquired for £1.3 billion by Citi through its Smith Barney subsidiary.

He joined Citi as chairman of Citigroup Europe and was a member of The Operating Committee of Citigroup Inc., a position he held until appointed chairman in November 2007. He is a non-executive director at S&P Global, Eli Lilly and Company, Land Securities, Akbank and Prudential.

On 27 July 2009, he was appointed as chairman designate of Lloyds Banking Group and took up the position of chairman on 15 September 2009. He held this position until his retirement on 3 April 2014.

Between May 2014 and October 2019 he was chairman of the UK Financial Reporting Council.

He is a member of the 30% Club, a group of FTSE-100 Chairmen committed to having at least 30% of their Boardmembers being female.

References

External links

 

1941 births
Living people
People from Aachen
German chairpersons of corporations
German expatriates in South Africa
German expatriates in the United Kingdom
British chairpersons of corporations
Citigroup people
Eli Lilly and Company people
Knights Bachelor
University of the Witwatersrand alumni
Chairmen of Lloyds Banking Group
Schroders people